This is the results breakdown of the local elections held in Asturias on 10 June 1987. The following tables show detailed results in the autonomous community's most populous municipalities, sorted alphabetically.

Overall

City control
The following table lists party control in the most populous municipalities, including provincial capitals (shown in bold). Gains for a party are displayed with the cell's background shaded in that party's colour.

Municipalities

Avilés
Population: 86,141

Gijón
Population: 258,291

Langreo
Population: 53,987

Mieres
Population: 57,025

Oviedo
Population: 185,864

San Martín del Rey Aurelio
Population: 25,186

Siero
Population: 42,108

See also
1987 Asturian regional election

References

Asturias
1987